Our Lady of Willesden is a title of the Blessed Virgin Mary venerated by Christians in London, especially by Anglicans and Catholics. It is associated with the historic image (statue) and pilgrimage centre in the community of Willesden, originally a village in Middlesex, England, but now a suburb of London. The pre-Reformation shrine was home to the Black Madonna of Willesden statue.

History

Once a country shrine some eight miles from London, Willesden has always possessed a well, from which the community derives its name, which means "spring at the foot of the hill". The well was associated with the Blessed Virgin Mary, and with the church dedicated to her, St Mary's, Willesden. The church and well are of great antiquity, being mentioned in a royal charter of 939. Whilst the origins of the pilgrimage tradition are lost in history, it is clear that a significant volume of pilgrims visited the site, and medieval pilgrim medals were struck and sold, a number of which have been uncovered by archeological investigation. Thomas More was a pilgrim here only a fortnight before his arrest.

A Visitation report dated 1249 reports two statues of the Blessed Virgin Mary at St Mary's Church. It is uncertain what the second image was, but the primary one was the "Black Madonna" image of Our Lady of Willesden, the central point of veneration for the pilgrims who journeyed to Willesden. The statue was said to possess miraculous powers.

At the Reformation the English shrines of Mary were destroyed, and their images burned. The "Black Madonna" image of Our Lady of Willesden was dragged to Chelsea in 1538, and burned there by the King's Commissioners.

Restoration

In a similar manner to Our Lady of Walsingham, who is venerated at twin Anglican and Roman Catholic shrines a mile apart, Our Lady of Willesden today has two shrines. The original has been restored in the Anglican parish church of St Mary, and a Roman Catholic shrine has been established about two miles away in the Roman Catholic Church of Our Lady of Willesden, where a crowned image of Our Lady forms the focus of the shrine. At both Walsingham and Willesden the twin shrines provide a vehicle for practical ecumenical endeavour between the two traditions.

St. Mary's Church

At the start of the twentieth century the Reverend James Dixon, Vicar of Willesden, restored the shrine, and placed a gilded image of Mary and Jesus at the location within the parish church where the original had once stood. A small number of pilgrims began visiting the shrine. The Right Reverend Graham Leonard, Bishop of Willesden 1964-1973, actively promoted pilgrimage to the shrine of Our Lady of Willesden, and in 1972 a new "Black Madonna" statue was commissioned from the sculptor Catharni Stern. On completion it was set in the former chapel of St Catherine within St Mary's parish church, Willesden, and the chapel was redesignated the Shrine Chapel. A visit to this chapel is now the climax of the Willesden pilgrimage.

The older image was left in place, so that since 1972 the shrine has housed two images of the Blessed Virgin Mary, just as it did in medieval times according to the 1249 visitation report.

The original spring and holy well at St Mary's Church, which had become lost through disuse after the Reformation, were rediscovered in 1998, and returned to use.

The original shrine at St Mary's Church is administered by the parochial church council, working in close cooperation with the Chapter of Our Lady of Willesden. The day to day direction of the Companionate is in the hands of a chapter of capitular priests (usually numbering six, of whom the vicar of St Mary's, Willesden, is a member ex officio), and laity (of whom the churchwardens of St Mary's are also ex officio members). Chapter priests of Our Lady of Willesden are distinguished by a black mozzetta with pale blue buttons, piping of blue and gold, and the seal of Our Lady of Willesden embroidered on the left breast. Lay members of chapter are distinguished by a pale blue collarette from which the shrine badge is displayed.

The Companionate of Our Lady of Willesden is an Anglican devotional society for those who wish to be associated with the shrine. It is headed by an Episcopal Patron, a bishop who provides the figurative leadership of the Companions. Members, not on the chapter, are known as a priest-companion or lay-companion, as the case may be. Companions wear the seal of Our Lady of Willesden as a badge, and undertake to pray for the work of the Shrine, and to visit it on pilgrimage when able.

Private pilgrimages and parish pilgrimages journey to the shrine of Our Lady of Willesden throughout the year, but the main national pilgrimage takes place on a Saturday in July. The format of the day usually involves a public procession in the morning, a celebration of mass at midday in St Mary's parish church, a variety of stalls and entertainments during the afternoon, sprinkling at the holy well in the late afternoon, and benediction of the blessed sacrament to end the pilgrimage day.

Church of Our Lady of Willesden 

In 1885 a Catholic Mission was established in Harlesden for the growing Irish population. "[W]ith the help of the local Convent of Jesus and Mary, devotion was fostered to Our Lady of Willesden and a new statue blessed by Cardinal Vaughan in 1892." The mission was served by a temporary chapel on Manor Park Road. In 1907, a larger church was built in Crown Hill. The mission became a parish in 1918 and a new church and shrine was built in 1931. The northeast chapel is the shrine chapel of Our Lady of Willesden. The Guild of Our Lady of Willesden was established in 2002. The Roman Catholic Diocese of Westminster celebrates the Feast of Our Lady of Willesden on 3 October. The annual Catholic pilgrimage takes place in May.

See also 
 Dowry of Mary
 Our Lady of Cardigan
 Our Lady of Doncaster
 Our Lady of Ipswich
 Our Lady of Walsingham
 Our Lady of Westminster

References

Anglo-Catholicism
Anglican Mariology
Shrines to the Virgin Mary
Catholic pilgrimage sites
Christianity in medieval England
Willesden
Titles of Mary
Roman Catholic shrines in the United Kingdom